The Roxy Pro France is an event on the Women's World Championship Tour, hosted by ASP World Surfing Tour.

Naming
Since the birth of this competition it had different names.

Results

See also
 Quiksilver Pro France
 Roxy Pro Gold Coast
 Roxy

References

External links

 
World Surf League
Surfing competitions in France
Sport in Landes (department)
Women's surfing